Korolyovo is a rural locality (a village) in Pokrovskoye Rural Settlement, Velikoustyugsky District, Vologda Oblast, Russia. The population was 8 as of 2002.

Geography 
The distance to Veliky Ustyug is 42 km, to Ilyinskoye is 12 km. Palema is the nearest rural locality.

References 

Rural localities in Velikoustyugsky District